Panakaduwa copper plate is a Sri Lankan copper plate made at the request of King Vijayabahu I for a high-ranking general called Budalna (Sithnarubim Buddhanayake (Budalnavan), Dandanayake of Ruhuna). The main reason for this to be inscribed on the plate is the aid that was given by him to juvenile prince Kirthi (Vijayabahu I) and his family during his pre-regnal days from the Cholas. The king triumphed over the Chola ruler (he defeated the army led by Lokissara to secure his kingdom in Kacharagama (Katharagama, Magama)) and victoriously led his army to mainland India. It was apparently completed around 1082-83 in the 27th year of his reign.

Discovery 
It was found in a paddy field owned by a man living in Bogahadeniya, `called Suravirage Carolis Appohamy in February 1948. While the man was razing the turf for a paddy field, he encountered something glittering under the soil. He picked it up and found a piece of the copper plate. He took that home. As time went on, his family contracted disease which in turn made the man believe that the copper plate was the cause. He then took it to Vanarathana Thero of the Urapola Siri Rathanajothi Pirivena. Knowing its significance, he informed the Archaeological Officer of Polonnaruwa, Sarath Wattala who in turn informed Prof. Senerath Paranavitana and procured it for him. Paranavitana translated and disclosed its meaning to Sri Lankan history.

Content 
According to Senerath Paranavithana, this copper plate was rendered by Vijayabahu I to fulfill his obligations towards Budalna. According to the plate, the king had spared him and his descendants from  the wrongdoings (including burglary) they would be committing or had committed in the future or the past.   

And orders that Lord Budal and his descendants be exempted from all forms of punishment.

According to Paranavitana, “After the royal order was delivered, its contents were embodied in formal phraseology which repeats the substance of the King’s words…a full month seems to have elapsed between the delivery of the order and the grant of the documents embodying it.”

Description 
The indenture is inscribed in three copper plates measuring 1 ft. and 2.5 inches in length and 3 inches in breadth. The plates were pinched in a peculiar way so as to allow a string to pass through its edges. Seven inscriptions appear on each side of the plates.

References 

Archaeological discoveries in Asia
History of Sri Lanka